Lygomusotima constricta is a moth in the family Crambidae. It was described by Maria Alma Solis and Shen-Horn Yen in 2004. It is found in the Philippines (Luzon).

The length of the forewings is 6–7 mm

The larvae probably feed on Lygodium species.

Etymology
The species name is refers to the anterior constriction of the ductus bursae in the female.

References

Moths described in 2004
Musotiminae